Santiago Ojeda (1 July 1944 – 3 March 1997) was a Spanish judoka. He competed in the men's heavyweight event at the 1972 Summer Olympics.

References

External links
 

1944 births
1997 deaths
Spanish male judoka
Olympic judoka of Spain
Judoka at the 1972 Summer Olympics
People from Gran Canaria
Sportspeople from the Province of Las Palmas
20th-century Spanish people